Are You Being Served? is a 1977 British comedy film based on the BBC sitcom Are You Being Served? (1972–1985), which follows the staff of the men's and women's clothing departments of the London Grace Brothers department store. The story is an adaptation of the successful stage version of the show, which played at Winter Gardens, Blackpool. The film was directed by Bob Kellett and the screenplay was by series creators and writers David Croft and Jeremy Lloyd. The film also featured the performers from the television series, including Mollie Sugden, John Inman, Frank Thornton, Trevor Bannister, Arthur Brough, Wendy Richard and Nicholas Smith.

Plot
Mr Humphries is taking advantage of a staff discount on a blue rinse in the hairdressing dept. Mr Harman is demonstrating a new inflatable bikini to Miss Brahms and Mrs Slocombe.

Mr Lucas is chastised by Captain Peacock for being late again.

As Grace Brothers is being redecorated, the management sends the staff on a paid holiday to the resort of Costa Plonka, on the Spanish coast. On the first night they think they are allocated 7 "penthouses" but it is in fact "tent-houses" outside the hotel.

After various misfortunes and misunderstandings, they narrowly survive a gunfight between the revolutionaries and government troops. They are saved by a group of tanks that arrive on the scene; these prove to have been commandeered by Young Mr Grace, who wanted to visit his beleaguered underlings, but could not find a taxi.

Cast
John Inman as Mr Wilberforce Clayborne Humphries, the senior sales assistant on the men's counter.
Mollie Sugden as Mrs Betty Slocombe, the head of the ladies department and the film's main female protagonist.
Frank Thornton as Captain Stephen Peacock, the floorwalker at Grace Brothers. 
Trevor Bannister as Mr Dick Lucas, the junior of the men's department.
Wendy Richard as Miss Shirley Brahms, the Cockney junior of the ladies' department and Mrs Slocombe's friend.
Arthur Brough as Mr Ernest Grainger, the head of the men's department and the oldest member of the staff.  This was Arthur Brough's last appearance as Mr Grainger as he died before filming of series 6 began.
Nicholas Smith as Mr Cuthbert Rumbold, the manager of the floor.
Harold Bennett as Young Mr Grace, the elderly head of Grace Brothers department store.
Arthur English as Mr Beverley Harman, the head of the packing department.
Karan David as Conchita, a young waitress who works at the hotel. 
Glyn Houston as Cesar Rodriguez, a terrorist with a crush on Mrs Slocombe.
Andrew Sachs as Don Carlos Bernardo, the moderately dishonest hotel manager, and Cesar's unwilling accomplice.
Derek Griffiths as the Emir.
Nadim Sawalha and Sheila Steafel as various Grace Brothers customers.
Penny Irving as Miss Nicholson, Mr Grace's new secretary.
Raymond Bowers as Henry, the barber at Grace Brothers.
 Paul Grist as the Customs Officer

Production

Filming
Filming took place at Elstree Studios and London Gatwick Airport.

Release
The film opened in British cinemas from 31 July 1977 onwards.

Reception
In a contemporary review, John Pym of the Monthly Film Bulletin gave the film a negative review, stating that "The humour consists mainly of a withering selection of patent British puns; an inflatable brassiere, some let's-insult-the-Germans jokes and a rickety thunder-box which bolts from the outside are thrown in for good measure."

In a retrospective review, DVD Verdict Michael Stailey regards it as a film that is "guilty of violating almost every law of comedy and film." The film is widely considered to be lacking in originality, plot, and focus. At present, the film holds a 60% positive rating on Rotten Tomatoes; the cutoff for a positive rating is 59%.

References

External links
 
 
 

1977 films
1977 comedy films
Are You Being Served?
British comedy films
Films about vacationing
Films based on television series
Films directed by Bob Kellett
Films set in department stores
Films set in hotels
Films set in Spain
Films set in London
Films set in the 1970s
British films based on plays
EMI Films films
Films shot at EMI-Elstree Studios
1970s English-language films
1970s British films